Rif Raisovich Saitgareev (23 August 1960 – 18 June 1996) was an international speedway rider from the Soviet Union and Russia.

Speedway career 
Saitgareev was four times champion of the Russia after winning the Russian Individual Speedway Championship in 1983, 1984, 1988 and 1995. He was also the Soviet Union Champion in 1982, 1984 and 1989.

He was fatally injured in a track accident at Ostrów Wielkopolski in Poland on 6 June 1996. He was riding in the Polish Team Championship match between Unia Leszno and Iskra Ostrów when he attempted to avoid falling riders in front of him. He lost control of his bike and hit a wall near the entrance gate. He was transferred to hospital with serious head injuries but died 12 days later.

See also
Rider deaths in motorcycle racing

References 

1960 births
1996 deaths
Russian speedway riders
Sportspeople from Ufa
Motorcycle racers who died while racing
Sport deaths in Poland